This is a list of mayors of Altstätten, Switzerland. The mayor (Stadtpräsident) chairs the city council (Stadtrat). Earlier terms for "mayor" were: Gemeindeammann, Stadtammann.

References

Altstatten
 
Altstätten